Leyli Khaneh (also Romanized as Leylī Khāneh; also known as Laili Kand, Leli-Khana, Leylā Khānī, and Leylī Kand) is a village in Bakrabad Rural District, in the Central District of Varzaqan County, East Azerbaijan Province, Iran. At the 2006 census, its population was 125, in 31 families.

References 

Towns and villages in Varzaqan County